Inherit The Void is the second album by Finnish metal band Profane Omen. It was recorded in September–November 2008 at Petrax and Villvox Studios by Aleksanteri Kuosa. The album was mixed at Villvox by Aleksanteri Kuosa and Williami Kurki and it was mastered at the Cutting Room Studios by Björn Engelmann. Album was produced by Ville Sorvali and Profane Omen, except vocals were produced by Mikko Herranen

Track listing

Chart positions

Personnel

Jules Näveri: Vocals
Williami Kurki: Guitar
Antti Kokkonen: Guitar
Tuomas "Tomppa" Saarenketo: Bass
Samuli Mikkonen: Drums

External links

References

2009 albums
Profane Omen albums